Proacina is one of eight parishes in Proaza, a municipality within the province and autonomous community of Asturias, in northern Spain. 

References

Parishes in Proaza